Przybyszew  is a village in the administrative district of Gmina Promna, within Białobrzegi County, Masovian Voivodeship, in east-central Poland.

The village has a population of 780.

External links
 Jewish Community in Przybyszew on Virtual Shtetl

References

Przybyszew